Maya Bruney (born 24 February 1998) is a pro track athlete and creative, competing for Italy in the 200m, 400m,  and  events. She is a BRIT School design graduate and has a degree in graphic design.

Maya became the only athlete to achieve a hat-trick of medals at the 2017 European Athletics U20 Championships. She became the 2017 European Junior 200m Champion, 4 x 100-metre relay bronze medalist and 4 x 400-metre relay bronze medalist, placing Britain top of the medal table at the Championships. She broke Shirley Thomas's 30-year-old Surrey record for the 200 metres, running 23.04 seconds and set the 2017 European Junior 200m Leading Time.

Biography 
Maya Bruney was born in London, UK and from 2012 to 2016, she attended the BRIT School in Croydon. In July 2014, Maya was awarded the BRIT School excellence in design award for a sneaker design and in July 2016, was awarded for the second time for her end of year design portfolio. Her design portfolio gave her offers at Goldsmiths, Loughborough University and the University of East London. Maya felt that the University of East London was the best university to attend to balance her graphic design studies and athletics career as she could live at home and be closer to Norman Park Athletics Track.

Bruney's parents are Silvia and David. Silvia is from Italy and David is from Dominica. Silvia is a nutritionist and David is a project manager and cycling enthusiast, with a coaching qualification in sprint mechanics.

Maya started athletics at 7 years old and began competing for South London Harriers at 10 years old. She competed in the Long Jump and sprint events. At 12 years old, Maya transferred to Blackheath and Bromley Harriers Athletic Club where she was coached by her father, David.

During this time, she became the 2009 and 2010 Surrey Championship Champion for the Long Jump, 100-metre and 200-metre events. In 2011, Maya became the 200m English Schools' Athletics Championships Champion. In 2012, she became the 100m English Schools' Athletics Championships Champion and was part of the English Schools' Athletics Championships U15 record-breaking Surrey 4 x 100-metre team, coached by her father. To this day, the team holds the British U15 Record in the 4 x 100-metre relay in a time of 47.37.

In February 2017, Maya became the British Indoor Athletics Championships 200m bronze medalist. She then began her outdoor season in April with the British Universities and Colleges Sport, where she became the 200m Champion. In July, Maya became the only athlete to achieve a hat-trick of medals at the 2017 European Athletics U20 Championships. She became the 2017 European Junior 200m Champion, 4 x 100-metre relay bronze medalist and 4 x 400-metre relay bronze medalist. She broke Shirley Thomas's 30-year-old Surrey record for the 200 metres, running 23.04 seconds and set the 2017 European Junior 200m Leading Time.

After her successful 2017 season, Maya was nominated for the European Athlete of the Year award and became the England Athletics U20 Performance Athlete of the Year at the England Athletics Hall of Fame event. She was also nominated for the Athletics Weekly U20 Female Readers Choice Awards. Maya signed with Puma from 2017 to 2019.

After graduating from the University of East London in 2019, Maya decided to train with The Winner's Circle US under Coach Dwight Phillips in Atlanta, United States. In February 2021, World Athletics confirmed Maya's transfer of allegiance from Britain to Italy. She now competes for the best female athletic club in Italy, Bracco Atletica  and is racing for the Italian Athletics Federation. In February 2022, Maya placed third in the 400m indoor and was part of the record breaking 4 x 400m relay team  at the Italian Championships. After 3 years in Atlanta, in April 2022, Maya transferred to Rome, Italy.

Achievements

Personal bests 
Outdoors
 200 metres – 23.04 (−1.0 m/s, Grosseto 22 Jul 17)
 400 metres – 53.1 (Bedford 7 May 18)
 4 × 400 m Split Time – 51.70 (Grosseto 23 Jul 17)

References

External links 
 
 
 Maya Fonda Bruney at FIDAL 
 

1998 births
British female sprinters
Alumni of the University of East London
People educated at the BRIT School
Living people
Italian sprinters